Alan Buchanan (1922-2015) was an English naval architect and sailor. He designed over 2400 vessels, including yachts that won Admiral's Cup, Cowes Week, and the Fastnet Race.

Buchanan started his career as a draftsman and aircraft engineer at the De Havilland Aircraft Company.   His family having a summer house in West Mersea, he was a regular visitor from a young age.   After he left de Havilland, he started as a boat designer firstly from his home in Enfield and then at his office which he established in Burnham-on-Crouch.

In the early years many of his designs were built by the boatyard of  William Wyatt in West Mersea and by 1950 he had a busy design office in Burnham employing about ten staff.

In 1948 the Burnham boatyard of RH Prior & Son started work on his first design specifically for ocean racing.   This was the 10.3 metre (34 feet) Red Gurnet.

The first yacht he designed for himself and his wife was the 9.4m (31') LOA Bermudan Sloop Taeping. She was launched on 15 May 1954 having been built by Priors of Burnham.

In 1956 he was commissioned by the London Rowing Club for a vessel (Casamajor)which had to be fast but with minimal wash for use as a coaching boat for their racing eights on the River Thames.   She was built by Tucker Brown & Co of Burnham.

Sir Maurice Laing commissioned Buchanan to design him a yacht for ocean racing which was the 11.2m (37') Vashti.   She was very successful in RORC racing and her sistership Rival, built in Australia, was handicap  winner in the 1961 Sydney Hobart race.

In the 1950s and 60s Buchanan was designing steel-built yachts where the basic steelwork was completed in Dutch yards and the fitting out being done in England.

Also in the mid-1950s the Buchanan Design Office was working on fibreglass designs and developed the first European-built glassfibre yacht, the 10.6m (35') Bonito.   Their first production design was the 6.8m Crystal Class which later became the well-known Halcyon 23 of which well over 1000 have been built.   The Diamond Class shortly followed, becoming in 1968 the Halcyon 27, and remained in production until 1975, about 200 having been built.
Although mainly known as a sailing yacht designer, Buchanan was also responsible for motor yachts like the 19.8 metre twin-screw Sita II as well as numerous commercial motor vessels such as ferries and fishing vessels.

In 1997 he received a medal from the RINA for his small craft designs.

Designs

Buchanan's designs include"
Bonito 35
Brabent
Buchanan Dragonfly
Buchanan Nantucket Clipper 32
Buchanan Queen 38
Buchanan Spartan-1
Buchanan Spartan-2
Buchanan Viking 30
Crystal 23
Diamond 27
East Anglian 28
Halcyon 23
Halcyon 27
Halcyon Clipper 26
Hilbre One Design
Holliwell 22
Neptune 33
Nepuntian 33
Prior 37
Saxon 34
Wild Duck 19
Yeoman Junior

References

1922 births
2015 deaths
Jersey people
British naval architects
20th-century British businesspeople